Holly Township may refer to:
 Holly Township, Michigan
 Holly Township, Murray County, Minnesota
 Holly Township, Pender County, North Carolina, in Pender County, North Carolina

Township name disambiguation pages